José González (born 15 October 1947) is a Cuban sports shooter. He competed in the men's 50 metre rifle, prone event at the 1976 Summer Olympics.

References

1947 births
Living people
Cuban male sport shooters
Olympic shooters of Cuba
Shooters at the 1976 Summer Olympics
Place of birth missing (living people)